Kali Reis (born August 24, 1986) is an American professional boxer and actress. She is a former world champion in two weight classes, having held the WBC female middleweight title in 2016 and the WBA, WBO, and IBO female light welterweight titles between 2020 and 2022. She also challenged Cecilia Brækhus for the undisputed female welterweight title in 2018.

In 2021, Reis made her acting debut as the star of the American thriller film, Catch the Fair One, for which she also received story credit. For her performance as a boxer endeavoring to rescue her missing sister, Reis was nominated for Best Female Lead at the 37th Independent Spirit Awards.

Personal life
Reis was born in Providence, Rhode Island, on August 24, 1986 and is the youngest of five children. She and her siblings were raised by their mother in East Providence, Rhode Island. Reis claims Cape Verdean ancestry and identifies as being of Native American descent, specifically Cherokee, Nipmuc, and Seaconke Wampanoag ancestry. As a child, she attended and competed in powwows regularly. She has incorporated her Native name, 'Mequinonoag' (meaning 'many feathers' or 'many talents'), into her boxing nickname, 'K.O. Mequinonoag'. 

Reis was an athletic child and often played rougher sports with the neighborhood boys. She also was involved in her school's bands/marching bands and color guard, as well as playing high school volleyball. Since junior year of high school she was active in basketball and softball leagues. She started boxing at age 14 out of Manfredo's Gym in Pawtucket, Rhode Island, and was coached by a friend of her mother. Reis later went to school for criminology and also learned how to repair motorcycles at MTTI. Reis went on to continue her training at Peter Manfredo's Sr. gym to advance her boxing career. Before going pro, Reis had a successful amateur career, securing the 2007 Rocky Marciano Championship, the 2007 NYC Golden Gloves, and the 2006 New England 154 Championship.

Reis is an active supporter of the Missing and Murdered Indigenous Women and Girls (MMIWG) movement.

Professional boxing career
In 2012, Reis was involved in a serious motorcycle accident that sidelined her for the remainder of the boxing season. However, she returned in 2013 and fought for the WIBA title in November of that year. Reis gained further attention in the sport after the match.  On November 12, 2014, Reis won the IBA crown defeating Teresa Perozzi in Bermuda. Reis also coaches boxing for youth and works as a trainer. In April 2016, Reis won her first major world title in New Zealand against Maricela Cornejo for the vacant WBC World Middleweight title.

HBO broadcast its first women's bout between Cecilia Brækhus and Reis, on May 5, 2018, which Brækhus won.

Acting career
Reis became involved in Catch The Fair One after filmmaker Josef Kubota Wladyka discovered Reis's advocacy for the MMIWG movement and asked if she would collaborate as a co-writer and lead actress on a film about that subject . Catch The Fair One premiered in June 2021 at the Tribeca Film Festival. The film and Reis's debut performance received critical acclaim.

Reis was cast in Jean-Stéphane Sauvaire's upcoming film Black Flies, starring Sean Penn, Tye Sheridan, and Katherine Waterston.

In June 2022, Reis was announced as the co-lead of True Detective: Dark Country, the fourth season of HBO's anthology crime series. Reis will star alongside Jodie Foster as a detective investigating the disappearance of six men from an Alaskan research station.

Accolades 
For her role in Catch The Fair One, Reis won the Jury Award for Best Actress at the 2021 Newport Beach Film Festival. She was also nominated for Best Female Lead at the 37th Independent Spirit Awards.

Professional boxing record

Filmography

References

External links
 
 

1986 births
21st-century Native Americans
American women boxers
American people of Cherokee descent
Boxers from Rhode Island
Living people
Light-welterweight boxers
Welterweight boxers
Light-middleweight boxers
Middleweight boxers
World light-welterweight boxing champions
World middleweight boxing champions
World Boxing Association champions
World Boxing Council champions
Native American boxers
Native American sportspeople
Sportspeople from Providence, Rhode Island
21st-century Native American women